The Poland women's national basketball team represents Poland in international women's basketball competitions. It is administered by the Polski Związek Koszykówki (PZKosz.).

Competition record

See also
 Basketball in Poland
 Poland women's national under-19 basketball team
 Poland women's national under-17 basketball team
 Poland women's national 3x3 team
 Polish women's basketball league (PLKK)

References

External links

 Official website of the Polish Basketball Federation
 Poland National Team - Women Presentation at Eurobasket.com
 Poland Basketball Records at FIBA Archive

 
 
Women's national basketball teams